The Lockheed TriStar is an tanker/transport aircraft formerly in service with the Royal Air Force (RAF). All are converted civilian Lockheed L-1011-500 TriStar airliners—previously operated by British Airways and Pan American World Airways—and entered service with the RAF in 1984.

The converted aircraft were purchased following the Falklands War, after a requirement for additional air-to-air refuelling (AAR) operations had been identified. Of the nine in service, two were tankers (K1) with passenger space and also limited space for cargo loaded aft of the main deck; three were solely transport aircraft (C2); and the remaining four (KC1) could be used for either of the two roles. The TriStars formed the air-to-air refuelling fleet of the RAF until replaced by the Airbus A330 MRTT under the Future Strategic Tanker Aircraft (FSTA) programme.

The TriStar fleet was operated by No. 216 Squadron of RAF Brize Norton in Oxfordshire. No. 216 Squadron was officially disbanded on 20 March 2014 and flew its last sorties with the TriStar on 24 March 2014. Three aircraft were scrapped in 2014 for spare parts shortly after retirement. The remaining six aircraft are currently located at Bruntingthorpe Aerodrome, having been purchased by AGD Systems Corp in anticipation of a later sale. The aircraft are being maintained by GJD Systems to a fully airworthy condition.

Design and development

The Royal Air Force operated nine L-1011-500s TriStars, six ex-British Airways and three ex-Pan Am. The TriStars were bought in the immediate aftermath of the Falklands War to bolster the long range capability of the RAF in the transport and tanker roles, as the demands of refuelling Hercules supporting forces stationed in the Falklands was rapidly using up the fatigue life of the RAF's Handley Page Victor tankers. A requirement for at least four wide-bodied tanker/transports was drawn up.  At the same time, British Airways wished to dispose of its Lockheed L-1011-500 aircraft, and so put in a joint bid with Marshall Aerospace to supply six TriStars. The initial order for the ex-British Airways TriStars was placed on 14 December 1982; the three ex-Pan Am aircraft were purchased in 1984. All of the aircraft served with No. 216 Squadron, based at RAF Brize Norton.

Marshall Aerospace performed the conversion of the TriStars. Two of the aircraft were passenger/tanker aircraft designated TriStar K1s. Another four could operate as either tankers or passenger/cargo aircraft - these are KC1s. Three were pure passenger aircraft; two TriStar C2 and the solitary TriStar C2A. The C2A differed from the C2s in having some military avionics and a new interior.

The RAF's TriStars were subject to progressive updating, including the fitting of flight deck armour and Directional Infrared Counter Measures to protect against ground fire when flying into Iraq. The aircraft were to be fitted with an updated cockpit, but this was abandoned due to the upcoming out-of-service-date.

The TriStar was expected to remain in service with the RAF until the end of the 2010s, when it was scheduled to be replaced by the Airbus A330 MRTT under the Future Strategic Tanker Aircraft (FSTA) programme. However, the date was brought forward to 2014 under the Strategic Defence and Security Review of 2010. The Airtanker consortium, led by EADS, won the FSTA contract in January 2004. During doubts over the FSTA program, Marshall Aerospace offered to buy and convert some of the large number of surplus commercial TriStars as tankers, but this was rejected.

Operational history

The first British Airways TriStar to be purchased by the RAF was G-BFCB on 2 November 1982, however it was leased back to British Airways on 29 March 1983 until November, eventually undergoing conversion in 1986. The initial converted L-1011-500 to be delivered to the Royal Air Force was TriStar KC1 ZD953 (G-BFCF) on 24 March 1986 when it was handed over at Cambridge Airport by Sir Arthur Marshall. The aircraft was accepted by Air Chief Marshal Sir Joseph Gilbert, with ZD953 becoming No. 216 Squadron's first TriStar, having been reactivated on 1 November 1984.

The TriStar saw service throughout many conflicts, with the first being the 1991 Gulf War as part of Operation Granby. On 6 January 1991, a single TriStar K1 with two crews was deployed to King Khalid International Airport, near Riyadh in Saudi Arabia as a tanker. Two TriStar K1s (ZD949 and ZD951) during the deployment were painted in a pinkish desert camouflage earning them the nicknames of "Pinky" and "Perky". By the end of the deployment in March, the TriStar K1s had accumulated over 430 flying hours after flying over 90 AAR missions and transferring 3,100,000 kilograms of fuel. The rest of the fleet were used for transport between the Persian Gulf and United Kingdom.

After the outbreak of the Bosnian War in April 1992, the United Nations passed Resolution 781 on 9 October, banning military flights over Bosnia and Herzegovina. A following resolution (816) was passed on 31 March 1993 prohibiting all non-authorised flights. On 12 April, NATO began Operation Deny Flight to enforce Resolution 816, under which two TriStars of No. 216 Squadron were deployed to Italy to provide AAR for fighters carrying out this policing of airspace. After the situation escalated in the 1999 Kosovo War, three TriStars were deployed once more to Italy under Operation Engadine in order to support NATO aircraft. Over the course of Op ENGADINE, five TriStars operated in the theatre delivering 13.5 million lbs of fuel to 1,580 aircraft across 230 missions.

TriStars joined Vickers VC10s in the air-to-air refuelling role for Operation Veritas (Afghanistan), during which they provided aerial-refuelling for US Navy aircraft.

In 2003, the RAF deployed TriStars to Bahrain as part of Operation Telic.

In October 2006, Marshall Aerospace was awarded £22 million contract to modernise the TriStar under the project name of 'Minimum Military Requirements' (MMR). In early 2007, TriStar K1 ZD949 arrived at Cambridge Airport to undergo numerous upgrades, including a glass cockpit. However, due to the Strategic Defence and Security Review of 2010 these upgrades were halted and ZD949 was left at Cambridge Airport to be used for spare parts.

TriStar air-to-air refuelling aircraft supported the British air strikes on Libya on 19–20 March 2011 as part of the coalition operations to enforce UN Resolution 1973.

In August 2013, a TriStar from No. 216 Squadron was detached in order to provide AAR support as part of No. 1312 Flight at RAF Mount Pleasant due to the forthcoming retirement of the Vickers VC10. The TriStar was replaced in this role in February 2014 by an Airbus Voyager KC3.
No. 216 Squadron was disbanded at RAF Brize Norton on 20 March. The final sortie of an RAF TriStar was carried on 24 March by ZD948 and ZD950 which refuelled four Eurofighter Typhoons and a single Panavia Tornado GR4, ZD950 returned to base while ZD948 conducted flypasts over Cambridge and Derby before returning to RAF Brize Norton for the last time.

Following their withdrawal from service, six TriStars made their last flights to Bruntingthorpe Aerodrome in Leicestershire while the remaining three were scrapped. ZD949 was the first to be scrapped on 27 May 2014 at Cambridge Airport, having last flown in November 2010 after the abandonment of the MMR upgrades. This was followed by ZE706 in June which was also at Cambridge Airport as a spares air frame, ZD952 was scrapped at Cotswold Airport on 9 September 2014 having arrived there in February.

In 2017, Tempus Applied Solutions, an aerospace company based in the United States, procured the six remaining ex-RAF TriStars for further use. Four of the purchased airframes were AAR conversions, with the other two being pure freight versions. The company's intention was to restore three of the AAR tankers to service in that role, providing additional probe and drogue aerial refueling capacity to the US Navy and NATO nations that utilize that particular method. The remaining three airframes will be utilized as sources of spares.

Variants

TriStar K1
Conversion of former British Airways TriStar 500s for tanker/transport/cargo role (not fitted with a cargo door), two aircraft. Additional fuel tanks of 100,000 lb capacity fitted in forward and aft baggage holds. Main cabin palletised and quickly configurable in mixed passenger / freight mode to seat up to 187 passengers with baggage stored forward end main deck. Two Flight Refuelling Mk 17T Hose Drum Units in underside aft rear fuselage.
TriStar KC1
Conversion of former British Airways TriStar 500s for tanker/cargo/transport role, four aircraft.
TriStar C1
Former British Airways TriStar 500s operated as passenger aircraft before tanker conversion.
TriStar C2
Former Pan Am TriStar 500s operated as passenger aircraft, with capability for carrying cargo and also Aeromed, two aircraft.
TriStar C2A
One former Pan Am TriStar 500 operated as passenger aircraft, different avionics to the two C2s.

Operators

Royal Air Force
RAF Brize Norton, Oxfordshire, England
No. 216 Squadron (1984–2014)
RAF Mount Pleasant, East Falkland, Falkland Islands
No. 1312 Flight (2013–2014)

Specifications (TriStar K1)

See also

References
Notes

Bibliography
 Prothero, R.M. "TriStar:The answer to an operational requirement". Air International, March 1991, Vol 40 No. 3. pp. 128–134.
 "TriStar Tankers...The RAF Goes Widebody". Air International, December 1985, Volume 29, No. 6. Bromley, UK: Fine Scroll. pp. 271–277, 309.
 Winchester, Jim. "Aircraft of the RAF - Part 9 TriStar". Air International. January 2009, Vol 76, No 1. pp. 50–53.
 Yenne, Bill, Lockheed. Crescent Books, 1987.

External links

 Royal Air Force - TriStar
 L-1011-500 page on airliners.net

TriStar (RAF)
Trijets
Low-wing aircraft
Aircraft first flown in 1970
Air refueling